Stafford Glacier is a glacier 5 nautical miles (9 km) east of Rudolph Glacier, flowing north into Trafalgar Glacier in the Victory Mountains, Victoria Land. Mapped by United States Geological Survey (USGS) from surveys and U.S. Navy air photos, 1960–62. Named by Advisory Committee on Antarctic Names (US-ACAN) for Sgt. Billy D. Stafford, USA, in charge of the enlisted detachment of the helicopter group which supported the USGS Topo North-South survey of the area in 1961–62.

Glaciers of Victoria Land
Borchgrevink Coast